Tiberio is an Italian given name from the Latin Tiberius, a derivative of the name of the river Tiber, as well as a surname. Notable people with the name include:

Given name 
 Tiberio Calcagni (1532–1565), Italian sculptor
 Tiberio Cavallo (1749–1809), Italian physicist and natural philosopher
 Tiberio Crispo (1498–1566), cardinal-nephew of Pope Paul III, bishop of Sessa Aurunca (1565–1566)
 Tiberio Cruz (born 1976), Colombian actor
 Tiberio Deciani (or Decianus) (1509–1582), Italian jurist working in the tradition of Renaissance humanism
 Tiberio Fiorilli, (1608–1694), Italian actor of commedia dell'arte known for developing the role of Scaramouche
 Tiberio Guarente (born 1985), Italian professional footballer
 César Tiberio Jiménez (born 1969), Mexican racing driver
 Tiberio Mitri (1926–2001), Italian boxer who fought from 1946 to 1957
 Tiberio Murgia (1929–2010), Italian film actor
 Tiberio d'Assisi (1470–1524), Italian painter of the Renaissance period
 Tiberio Tinelli (1586–1639), Italian painter of the early-Baroque period, active mainly in his native city of Venice
 Tiberio di Tito (1573–1627), Italian painter

Surname 
 Peter Tiberio (born 1989), American rugby union player
 Vincenzo Tiberio (1869–1915), researcher and medical officer in the Italian Navy, physician at the University of Naples

See also 
 
 
 Ponte di Tiberio (Rimini) or Bridge of Augustus, Roman bridge in Rimini, Italy
 Berio
 Tiber
 Tiberi, the patronymic form

References 

Italian masculine given names
Italian-language surnames